Ernst Fraenkel may refer to:

 Ernst Fränkel (physician) (1844–1921), German gynaecologist
 Ernst Fraenkel (linguist) (1881–1957), German linguist
 Ernst Fraenkel (political scientist) (1898–1975), German political scientist
 Ernst Fraenkel (businessman) (1923–2014), British businessman

See also
 Fränkel